The Super Bowl of Poker (also known as Amarillo Slim's Super Bowl of Poker or SBOP) was the second most prestigious poker tournament in the world during the 1980s.  While the World Series of Poker was already drawing larger crowds as more and more amateurs sought it out, the SBOP "was an affair limited almost exclusively to pros and hard-core amateurs."

Prior to 1979, the only high dollar tournament a person could enter was the WSOP.  1972 WSOP Main Event Champion and outspoken ambassador for poker Amarillo Slim saw this as an opportunity.  "The World Series of Poker was so successful that everybody wanted more than one tournament," he said.  Slim called upon his connections and friendships with poker's elite to start a new tournament in the February 1979.  Before the SBOP had developed a reputation of its own, many of the most respected names in poker attended the tournament "more to support Slim and take advantage of the very fat cash games the event would obviously inspire."  Slim modelled his SBOP after the WSOP with several events and a $10,000 Texas Hold'em Main Event.

One of the principal differences between the WSOP and the SBOP was the prize structure.  The WSOP's prize structure was flat ensuring more people received smaller pieces of the prize pool.  The SBOP typically used a 60-30-10 payout structure.  In other words, only the first three places received money and generally in the ratio of 60% to first place, 30% to second place, and 10% to third.  This payment schedule predominated the SBOP for the first 5 years of the event, but as the event grew the number of payouts increased while keeping the payout schedule top heavy.

1986 Tournament

Jack Keller, a member of the Poker Hall of Fame, won the Pot Limit Omaha in the 1986 SBOP.  But it was the Deuce-to-Seven Lowball event that may have had the toughest final three competitors ever.  Doyle Brunson, a Poker Hall of Famer, has won ten WSOP bracelets and won this event.  In order to win, he had to defeat two other Poker Hall Famers.  Billy Baxter, who own 7 bracelets, came in second place while Johnny Chan, the third-place finisher, is tied with Doyle for the second most bracelets at 10.  T. J. Cloutier, another member of the Hall, and Jack Keller both won separate $500 Limit Hold'em events.

Key

Event 1: $500 Limit Hold'em 

 Number of buy-ins: 164
 Total prize pool: $82,000
 Number of payouts: 7
 Reference:

Event 2: $1,000 Ace-to-Five Lowball 

 Number of buy-ins: 45
 Total prize pool: $45,000
 Number of payouts: Unknown
 Reference:

Event 3: 7 Card Stud 

 Number of buy-ins: 45
 Total prize pool: $45,000
 Number of payouts: Unknown
 Reference:

Event 4: $500 Limit Hold'em 

 Number of buy-ins: 97
 Total prize pool: $48,500
 Number of payouts: Unknown
 Reference:

Event 5: $500 Omaha 

 Number of buy-ins: Unknown
 Total prize pool: Unknown
 Number of payouts: Unknown
 Reference:

Event 6: Seven-Card Stud 

 Number of buy-ins: Unknown
 Total prize pool: Unknown
 Number of payouts: Unknown
 Reference:

Event 7: Deuce-to-Seven Lowball 

 Number of buy-ins: Unknown
 Total prize pool: Unknown
 Number of payouts: Unknown
 Reference:

Event 8: $200 No Limit Hold'em 

 Number of buy-ins: Unknown
 Total prize pool: Unknown
 Number of payouts: Unknown
 Reference:

Event 9: $2,500 7 Card Stud Hi/Lo 

 Number of buy-ins: Unknown
 Total prize pool: Unknown
 Number of payouts: Unknown
 Reference:

Event 10: Pot Limit Omaha 

 Number of buy-ins: Unknown
 Total prize pool: Unknown
 Number of payouts: Unknown
 Reference:

Event 11: $1,000 Hold'em 

 Number of buy-ins: Unknown
 Total prize pool: Unknown
 Number of payouts: Unknown
 Reference:

Event 12: $10,000 No Limit Hold'em 

 Number of buy-ins: Unknown
 Total prize pool: Unknown
 Number of payouts: Unknown
 Reference:

References

Super Bowl of Poker
1986 in poker